The Heydukova Street Synagogue is the only Jewish synagogue in Bratislava, the capital of Slovakia. It was constructed in 1923 – 1926 on Heydukova Street in the Old Town in Cubist style, designed by the local Jewish architect Artur Szalatnai.

The synagogue is an important example of Slovak religious architecture of the 20th century and it is listed as a Slovak National Cultural Monument. It is one of only four active synagogues in Slovakia and historically one of three in Bratislava;  the other two survived WW2 but were demolished in the 1960s. The building also houses the Bratislava Jewish Community Museum, installed upstairs, with a permanent exhibition “The Jews of Bratislava and Their Heritage” which is open to the public during the summer season.

History 
The architect Artur Szalatnai was selected by winning a competition for the project of a new synagogue. It was Szalatnai's first major work after finishing studies in Budapest. At the time of the construction, there were no houses in this part of Heydukova Street.

The synagogue exterior has a towerless, seven-pillared colonnade facing Heydukova Street. Entrance is situated at the building's eastern side, from the corridor connecting the street with the inner yard. The interior includes a large sanctuary in which modern steel-and-concrete construction and contemporary Cubist details are combined with historicist elements.

See also 

 History of the Jews in Slovakia
 History of Bratislava

References

Further reading
 Borský Maroš, Synagogue Architecture in Slovakia: A Memorial Landscape of the Lost Community, Menorah Foundation
 Dulla Matúš, Majstri architektúry, Perfect, pages 56 - 57
 Barkány Eugen, Židovské náboženské obce na Slovensku, Vesna, pages 48 - 49

External links

 Bratislava Synagogue
 The Slovak Jewish Heritage
 Jewish Religious Life in Bratislava Before the Holocaust, part of an online exhibition by Yad Vashem 

Buildings and structures in Bratislava
Jews and Judaism in Bratislava
Synagogues in Slovakia
Bratislava
Museums in Bratislava
Synagogues preserved as museums
1926 establishments in Slovakia
20th-century architecture in Slovakia 
Modernist architecture in Slovakia 
Synagogues completed in 1926